Winteria telescopa, the binocular fish, is a species of barreleye found in oceans around the world at depths from .  This species grows to a length of  SL. Unlike most barreleyes, this fish has more forward-facing eyes, but it still has the dome.

This fish was featured in the documentary series The Blue Planet.

References
 

Opisthoproctidae
Taxa named by August Brauer
Fish described in 1901